The 2005 Asian Archery Championships was the 14th edition of the event. It was held at the Jawaharlal Nehru Stadium in New Delhi, India from 4 to 10 November 2005 and was organized by Asian Archery Federation.

Medal summary

Recurve

Compound

Medal table

References

External links
 Results 

Asian Championship
A
A
Asian Archery Championships